is a professional footballer currently playing as a goalkeeper for Yokohama FC. Born in Italy, Ouchi has represented Japan at youth international level.

Career statistics

Club
.

Notes

References

External links

2000 births
Living people
Japanese footballers
Japan youth international footballers
Association football goalkeepers
J1 League players
J2 League players
J3 League players
Yokohama FC players
YSCC Yokohama players